Grey Peaks is a national park in Far North Queensland, Australia, 1,374 km northwest of Brisbane.  It is part of the Coastal Wet Tropics Important Bird Area, identified as such by BirdLife International because of its importance for the conservation of lowland tropical rainforest birds.

The forests of the national park dominate are dominated by large-fruited red mahogany Eucalyptus pellita and red turpentine Syncarpia glomulifera.

The average altitude of the terrain is 88 meters.

See also

 Protected areas of Queensland

References

National parks of Far North Queensland
Protected areas established in 1971
1971 establishments in Australia
Important Bird Areas of Queensland